Madhya Pradesh State Highway 18 (MP SH 18) is State Highway running from Bhopal till Limdi via Thandla. It is popularly known as Bhopal Road.

It passes through the religious center of Ujjain, the industrial city Dewas till the Gujarat Border via Thandla.

See Also
List of state highways in Madhya Pradesh

References

State Highways in Madhya Pradesh